“Emotional expressions”, also called “emotives” are an effort by the speaker to offer an interpretation of something that is observable to no other actor (Reddy 1997).  If emotions are feelings, emotives are the expressions of those feelings through the use of language, specifically through constructions that explicitly describe emotional states or attitudes. (Luke 2004).

Origin
The term was introduced by William M. Reddy in his article, Against Constructionism: The Historical Ethnography of Emotions (1997).  Reddy is a professor of History and Cultural Anthropology at Duke University.

Description
Emotives describe the process by which emotions are managed and shaped, not only by society and its expectations but also by individuals themselves as they seek to express the inexpressible, namely how they "feel" (Rosenwein 2002).  One important difference between emotive and descriptive use of language is the difference in intention.  The discourse of a man using language emotively, using it to express or to arouse feelings, differs in intention from the discourse of a man using language descriptively to convey descriptive meanings (Castell 1949).  Emotion claims are attempts to translate into words (1) nonverbal events that are occurring in this halo or (2) enduring states of this halo and this background. Emotion claims, as a result, can be viewed, by analogy with speech act theory, as constituting a special class of utterance, [called emotives] (Reddy 1999).  Reddy tells us in his later writing that emotives are similar to performatives in that emotives do things to the world.  Emotives are themselves instruments for directly changing, building, hiding, and intensifying emotions (Reddy 1999).  Ultimately, expressed emotions, i.e. emotives, may be more important than inner states of emotion in constructing a social reality (Luke 2004).

Sincerity
William Reddy includes the idea of sincerity as a key point in the effects of emotive.  The concept of emotives forces a redefinition of sincerity. Because of the powerful and unpredictable effects of emotional utterances on the speaker, sincerity should not be considered the natural, best, or most obvious state toward which individuals strive. On the contrary, probably the most obvious orientation toward the power of emotives is a kind of fugitive instrumentalism (Reddy 1999). One might say that, just as a performative can be happy or unhappy, an emotive brings emotional effects appropriate to its content or effects that differ markedly from its content.  If it does bring up appropriate effects, then the emotive, in Western context, might be said to be "sincere"; if it does not, the emotive may be claimed, after the fact, to be hypocrisy, an evasion, a mistake, a projection, or a denial (Reddy 1997).  Emotives are both self-exploring and self-altering (Reddy 1999).

Emotive in Sociology
The concept of emotive is compatible with Jürgen Habermas’s critique of poststructuralists on the grounds that their theory involves them in a “performative contradiction” – because they appear to speak and write with the intention of persuading us there are no intentions.  However, the concept of emotives also points toward a modification of Habermas's notion of communicative rationality, since in formulating emotives speakers are trying to communicate with themselves as much as with others (Reddy 1997; Koury, 2004).

Other connections to sociology involve emotives and emotionology, whereas emotionology sets standards only for others, the "you" of the advice manuals, emotives set standards for you, me, and them—the people involved in all emotive interactions.  Thus Reddy emphasizes the vocabulary of emotion, for only as people articulate their feelings can they "know" what they feel and, reflecting on their newfound knowledge, feel yet more (Rosenwein 2002).

Finally, Rational Emotive Behavior Therapy (REBT), developed by American psychologist Albert Ellis, is solution-aimed therapy that focuses on teaching patients how to change their "irrational beliefs by verbal and behavioral counter-propagandizing activity" (Ellis).  It is thought here that human beings on the basis of their belief system actively, though not always consciously, disturb themselves, and even disturb themselves about their disturbances (Rational Emotive Behavior Therapy).

References
Castell, Alburey.  1949.  “Meaning:  Emotive, Descriptive, and Critical.” Ethics 60: 55–61.
Ellis, Albert.  The Albert Ellis Site.  REBT Explained by Dr. Ellis. http://www.rebt.ws/REBT%20explained.htm
Luke, George W.  2004.  “State-Sponsored Advocacy?  The Case of Florida’s Students Working Against Tobacco.” Doctoral Dissertation, Florida State University.
Koury, Mauro Guilherme Pinheiro.  2004. Introdução à Sociologia da Emoção, João Pessoa, Editora Manufatura, Edições do GREM.
Koury, Mauro Guilherme Pinheiro. 2009. Emoções, Sociedade e Cultura, Curitiba, Editora CRV.
Reddy, William M.  1999. “Emotional Liberty: Politics and History in the Anthropology of Emotions.”  Cultural Anthropology 14: 256–288.
Reddy, William M.  1997. “Against Constructionism: The Historical Ethnography of Emotions.”  Current Anthropology 38: 327–351.
Rosenwein, Barbara H. 2002. “Worrying about Emotions in History.”  The American Historical Review. http://historycooperative.press.uiuc.edu/journals/ahr/107.3/ah0302000821.html
RBSE - Revista Brasileira de Sociologia da Emoção. João Pessoa, GREM https://web.archive.org/web/20070316125259/http://www.cchla.ufpb.br/rbse/Index.html

See also
Emotions
Social reality
Poststructuralist

Sociological terminology